Félix Gancedo (born 18 September 1940 in Málaga, Spain) is a Spanish sailor and world-class competitor in the Snipe, Flying Dutchman, Tempest and Dragon classes.

He won the Snipe class world championship in 1973 and 1975, was second in 1981 and third in 1971. Besides, he won the European championship of the class in four occasions (1972, 1974, 1978 and 1990); the Spanish nationals fifteen times (1969, 1970, 1971, 1972, 1973, 1974, 1975, 1977, 1978, 1979, 1980, 1981, 1983, 1985 and 1990); and the Masters Worlds (1991).

In the Flying Dutchman class, he was Spanish national champion 1964, 1967 and 1968.

Olympic Games
Gancedo sailed at 3 different Olympic Games:
 11th place in Flying Dutchman at Acapulco 1968.
 15th place in Dragon at Munich 1972.
 9th place in Tempest at Montréal 1976.

References

1940 births
Living people
Olympic sailors of Spain
Spanish male sailors (sport)
Sailors at the 1968 Summer Olympics – Flying Dutchman
Sailors at the 1972 Summer Olympics – Dragon
Sailors at the 1976 Summer Olympics – Tempest
Snipe class world champions
World champions in sailing for Spain
Sportspeople from Málaga